Cape Clairault is located south of Yallingup in the coastal region between Cape Naturaliste and Cape Leeuwin.

It was named after French mathematician Alexis Claude Clairault by the French expedition of 1801-1803 along the western coast of Australia.

The cape name has been used in a range of local winery business names.

The beach at the location is considered hazardous, and there are surf breaks nearby: Injidup Point and Carparks and Pea Break to the north, and the Wildcat and The Window breaks to the south. Cape Clairault break lies to the south of the Cape itself.

By line of sight, Cape Clairault extends out from the coast enough to be seen from Cape Naturaliste, or vice versa, and as a consequence is often cited as a landmark within the range of the Cape Naturaliste Lighthouse light.

See also
 Cape Freycinet
 Cape Mentelle
 Cape Hamelin

Notes

Capes region of South West Western Australia
Clairault